The 1945–46 season was the 31st in the history of the Isthmian League, an English football competition.

It was the first season after the break caused by World War II.

Nunhead and London Caledonians did not return after the war, while two clubs from the Athenian League - Romford and Walthamstow Avenue were newly admitted. Also, it was the first season in the Isthmian League for a new club Corinthian-Casuals, who took over a place of Casuals, who merged with Corinthian.

Walthamstow Avenue were champions in their inaugural season.

League table

References

Isthmian League seasons
I